Griner is a surname that may refer to the following people:

 Brittney Griner (born 1990), American basketball player
 Carolyn S. Griner, former Acting Director of the NASA Marshall Space Flight Center
 Dan Griner (1888–1950), Major League Baseball pitcher 
 George Wesley Griner, Jr. (1898–1975), American soldier
 Vera Griner (1890–1992), Russian rhythmitician
 Wendy Griner (born 1944), retired Canadian figure skater

See also
Grinder (surname)